Daun is a town in the Vulkaneifel district in Rhineland-Palatinate, Germany.

Geography

Location 
Daun lies south of the High Eifel on the river Lieser. Found from 2.5 to 3.5 km southeast of Daun’s town centre are the Dauner Maare, a group of three volcanic lakes separated almost wholly by only the walls of tuff between them. Daun is furthermore a spa town and has mineral water springs.

Constituent communities 
The district seat of Daun has 8,514 inhabitants (as of 31 December 2005, counting only those with their main residence in the town). Besides the main town, also called Daun (4,264 inhabitants), the municipal area also includes these outlying centres that were formerly self-administering municipalities:

History 
The first settlement in the area came as early as the 7th century BC by which time the Celts had settled the fortified basalt mountain in Daun. The Romans, too, used this prominent hill in the Lieser valley as a watch post, as witnessed by Roman finds. The placename may have come from the Celtic-Roman word Dunum, meaning either “fence” or “fortified heights”, that is to say, a fort.

In the late 10th century, a castle complex belonging to the free Lords of Daun arose here. In 1075, Daun had its first documentary mention in a townsman named Adalbero de Duna.

In 1163, the free lords’ family died out. One of the family’s ministeriales, Richardus de Duna, took over his former Lord’s name and even the coat of arms with the Daun fretting. In 1337, Daun is mentioned for the first time as being a town. In 1346 came a grant of town rights along with market rights, and Daun became at the same time the location of a high court.

In 1712, the Electoral-Trier  was built by the Elector of Trier and Archbishop Karl-Josef on the Burgberg ("Castle Mountain"). After a transitory occupation by the French beginning in 1794, the village passed in 1815 to the Kingdom of Prussia. In 1817, Daun became seat of the district and an  mayoralty, and also at the same time a district administrator’s seat. Since 1947, it has been part of the then newly founded state of Rhineland-Palatinate. Beginning in 1951, Daun could once more call itself a town.

In 1965, Daun became a garrison town, housing at the Heinrich Hertz Barracks, among others, two signal corps units and one signals intelligence unit.

Politics

Town council 
The council is made up of 12 council members, who were elected at the municipal election held on 25. May 2014, and the mayor as chairman.

Mayor 
Daun’s mayor is Friedhelm Marder (CDU).

Coat of arms 
The town’s arms might be described thus: Or fretty gules.

The arms now borne by the town are the ones once borne by the Lords of Daun, and date from the 13th century. When the Lords died out, the town passed to the Electorate of Trier, thus explaining the Cross of Trier that appeared in seals dating from the 16th and following centuries. The current arms, however, are the Lords’ original ones.

The Armorial Wijnbergen, dating from c. 1270 - c. 1285, includes Ferry II of Daun, lord of Oberstein (blazon: Argent fretty sable).

Town partnerships 
Daun fosters partnerships with the following places:
  Carisolo, Trentino, Italy since 4 April 2004

Culture and sightseeing

Natural monuments 
 
 
 

A maar is a broad-low relief volcanic crater often filled with rainwater. Tuff rings sometimes surround a maar. There are many in the Volcanic Eifel.

Buildings 
 Daun Castle (Dauner Burg)
 Electoral-Trier  (today a hotel) from 1712
 Evangelical church (1865/67)
 Tithe barn from 1740
 Burgmann houses: , 
 Railway viaduct from 1909
 Saint Nicholas’s Catholic Parish Church, west tower and crypt Romanesque, mid 13th century, new building work done between 1946 and 1969
 Railway station building, roof with half-hipped gables, 1895
 Former Evangelical graveyard with elaborate grave markers from the 19th century
 Former mayoral building
  (cross) from about 1825 (at the marketplace)
 Former  (“Emperor’s Fountain”), 1911, warriors’ memorial from after 1945 (at the former district administrator’s office)
 Former district administrator’s office, 1830/31, today the Volcano Museum
 Former recreation home of the department store chain Leonhard Tietz, 1910
 Former  court from 1860 (today a savings bank branch)
 Warriors’ memorial 1870/71
 Former school building from about 1910/20 (today a civil registry office)

Museums 
 Volcano Museum, Daun (Vulkanmuseum Daun) – about volcanic and other geological phenomena.

Regular events 
 The  begins each year on the Saturday after the first Wednesday in August and lasts five days. It is among the Eifel’s biggest folk festivals.
  (a mountainbike marathon through the Eifel mountains, also: VulkanBike trailpark, VulkanBike extreme and VulkanBike crosscountry)
 
  (walk)
  (“Late-August Airfield Festival”)
 Spring Festival

Economy and infrastructure

Established businesses

Near Daun are the Heinrich Hertz Barracks, which house, among other units:
  93 (Signal Corps Division 93)
  931 (SKB; Signal Intelligence section 931)
 Parts of the  service centre (WV)
 Daun Medical Centre (ZSan)

Media 

Education 
General:
 Primary school
 
 
 
 

Vocational:
  (nursing)
  (geriatric care)

Special schools:
 

Other schools:
 Music school
  (Training centre of the Federal Agency for Labour)

Clubs 
Sport:

Transport 

Daun is linked to the Autobahn A 1. Also,  421 and 257 lead through the town. The town is linked to the railway network through the railway station on the Cross Eifel Railway, running from Gerolstein to Andernach, but the line is currently closed between Kaisersesch and Gerolstein, including through Daun.

Notable people 
 Karl Fleschen (1955–    ), runner and Olympian
 Pascal "Pommes" Hens (1980–    ), national handball player, handball world champion 2007
 Andreas Schäfer (1983–    ), footballer
 Count Leopold Joseph von Daun (1705 – 1766), Austrian field marshal from the Holy Roman Empire noble family originating in Daun.

Further reading 
 Martina Knichel: "Gilles von Daun (1318-1358), Ritter und Räuber. Aus der Geschichte des Wanderns." - In: Jahrbuch für westdeutsche Landesgeschichte, 35 (2009), S. 73-86. 
 Ingrid Schumacher, Gilles. Egidius von Daun und seine Zeit, Daun 2002
 Generaldirektion Kulturelles Erbe Rheinland-Pfalz (Hrsg.):  . Koblenz 2010.

References

External links 

  

Vulkaneifel
Populated places in the Eifel